Alexandru Grigoraş (born 5 July 1989) is a Romanian footballer who plays as a striker for Axiopolis Cernavodă.

Career
Grigoraș began playing football as an attacker with Callatis Mangalia in the lower levels of Romanian football. In June 2011, he was out of contract and signed with Romanian Liga I side Pandurii Târgu Jiu, a club managed by his father, Petre Grigoraș.

Honours

Club
Pandurii
Liga I (1): runner-up 2013

References

External links

1989 births
Living people
Association football forwards
Romanian footballers
CS Pandurii Târgu Jiu players
FCV Farul Constanța players
FC Brașov (1936) players
AFC Săgeata Năvodari players
FC Delta Dobrogea Tulcea players
Liga I players
Liga II players
Liga III players
Sportspeople from Constanța